Verawaty Fadjrin (1 October 1957 – 21 November 2021) was an Indonesian badminton player who won international titles spanning from the late 1970s to the end of the 1980s. Tall and powerful, at one time or another she played each of the three variations of the sport (singles, doubles, and mixed doubles) at the highest world level.

Career 
During a relatively brief period as a regular singles competitor, Fadjrin won the 1980 IBF World Championships in Jakarta over fellow countrywoman Ivana Lie. She had been runner-up to Denmark's Lene Køppen at the All England Open Championships that year. She won the Southeast Asian Games title in 1981 and the Indonesia Open in 1982. Most of her early titles in women's doubles were in partnership with Imelda Wiguno. Together, they won the Asian Games (1978), the Danish Open (1979), the Canadian Open (1979), the All England (1979), and the Southeast Asian Games (1981). They were runners-up at the World Championships in 1980, and Fadjrin was runner-up at the 1982 All England with another fellow countrywoman Ruth Damayanti.

Following a hiatus in her international badminton career from 1983 to 1985, Fadjrin enjoyed impressive success in her late twenties and early thirties. She shared the women's doubles title at the Indonesia Open in 1986 and 1988, and finished second with Ivana Lie at the World Grand Prix Finals in 1986. Her greatest success late in her career, however, came in mixed doubles, which she had rarely played earlier. She won the 1986 and 1988 Malaysia Opens with Bobby Ertanto and Eddy Hartono respectively. In 1989, Fadjrin and Hartono won the World Grand Prix Finals, and the Dutch and Indonesia Opens together. They also reached the final round of the 1989 IBF World Championships in Jakarta, but could not overcome South Korea's Chung Myung-hee and the formidable Park Joo-bong.

Fadjrin led Indonesian Uber Cup (women's international) teams that finished second to Japan in 1978 and 1981, and to China in 1986. Of the seven matches won and the fourteen matches lost by Indonesia, collectively, in the final rounds of these three competitions, she was involved in six of the wins and only three of the losses. She also helped Indonesia win the Sudirman Cup (combined men's and women's team championship) over South Korea in 1989, her final year of international play.

Achievements

World Championships 
Women's singles

Women's doubles

Mixed doubles

World Cup 
Women's singles

Women's doubles

Mixed doubles

Asian Games 
Women's doubles

Mixed doubles

Southeast Asian Games 
Women's singles

Women's doubles

Mixed doubles

International tournaments 
The World Badminton Grand Prix was sanctioned by the International Badminton Federation from 1983 to 2006.

Women's singles

Women's doubles

Mixed doubles

 IBF Grand Prix tournament
 IBF Grand Prix Finals tournament

Invitational tournaments 
Women's singles

Women's doubles

References

Sources 
 Smash - Verawaty Fadjrin

1957 births
2021 deaths
Sportspeople from Jakarta
Indonesian female badminton players
Badminton players at the 1978 Asian Games
Badminton players at the 1982 Asian Games
Badminton players at the 1986 Asian Games
Badminton players at the 1990 Asian Games
Asian Games gold medalists for Indonesia
Asian Games silver medalists for Indonesia
Asian Games bronze medalists for Indonesia
Asian Games medalists in badminton
Medalists at the 1978 Asian Games
Medalists at the 1986 Asian Games
Medalists at the 1990 Asian Games
Competitors at the 1977 Southeast Asian Games
Competitors at the 1979 Southeast Asian Games
Competitors at the 1981 Southeast Asian Games
Competitors at the 1985 Southeast Asian Games
Competitors at the 1987 Southeast Asian Games
Competitors at the 1989 Southeast Asian Games
Southeast Asian Games gold medalists for Indonesia
Southeast Asian Games silver medalists for Indonesia
Southeast Asian Games bronze medalists for Indonesia
Southeast Asian Games medalists in badminton
21st-century Indonesian women
20th-century Indonesian women